Zogbodomey  or Zogbodomè is a town, arrondissement, and commune in the Zou Department of south-western Benin. The commune covers an area of 600 square kilometres and as of 2002 had a population of 72,338 people.

Administrative divisions
Zogbodomey is divided administratively into 11 arrondissements: Akiza, Avlamè, Cana I, Cana II, Domè, Koussoukpa, Kpokissa, Massi, Tanwé-Hessou, Zoukou and Zogbodomey. The commune contains 6 urban quarters and 59 villages.

Economy
The economy of Zogbodomey is based on agriculture, livestock, trade and agro food processing.

Agriculture employs over 80% of the population, with the main crops grown being maize and groundnuts, but in recent years, producers are turning to other commodities such as vegetables, cotton, cassava, soybeans, cowpeas, and rice.

Livestock production is limited to goats, sheep, pigs, poultry and rabbits.

Small and medium enterprises operate in Zogbodomey and transform products such as cassava, palm oil, vegetable oil and soybean etc.

There are a variety of markets and traders in the main town, and bars and restaurants have grown up in recent years, and new shops and stores.

Notable people
Georges Nobime (1965-)

References

External links
Official site
Communes du Benin

Communes of Benin
Arrondissements of Benin
Populated places in the Zou Department
Communes in Yorubaland